Jean-Pierre Rassam (1942–1985) was a Lebanese-French film producer of the 1970s. He was found dead, age 43, in his suite at the Plaza Athénée, the cause of death being barbiturate overdose, in 1985.

Personal life 
He was in a relationship with actress Carole Bouquet, with whom he has one son, film producer Dimitri Rassam. Bouquet has called him the love of her life.

Partial filmography
 Tess (1979)
 Don't Touch The White Woman! (1974)
 Lancelot of the Lake (1974)
 Blood for Dracula (1973)
 Flesh for Frankenstein (1973)
 La Grande Bouffe (1973)
 Tout va bien (1972)
We Won't Grow Old Together (1972)

References

French film producers
1942 births
1985 deaths
French people of Lebanese descent
1985 suicides